Laganidae is a family of echinoderms belonging to the order Clypeasteroida.

Genera

Genera:
 genus Cenofibula Gasser, 1994 † -- 1 current species
 genus Hupea Pomel, 1883 -- 1 species
 genus Jacksonaster Lambert, in Lambert & Thiéry, 1914 -- 1 species
 genus Laganum Link, 1807 -- 9 species
 sous-famille Neolaganinae Durham, 1954 †
 genus Cubanaster Sanchez Roig, 1952a † -- 6 species
 genus Durhamella Kier, 1968a † -- 2 species
 genus Neolaganum Durham, 1954 † -- 2 species
 genus Pentedium Kier, 1967b † -- 1 species
 genus Sanchezella Durham, 1954 † -- 1 species
 genus Tetradiella Liao & Lin, 1981 † -- 1 species
 genus Weisbordella Durham, 1954 † -- 3 species
 genus Wythella Durham, 1954 † -- 2 species
 genus Peronella Gray, 1855 -- 17 species
 genus Rumphia Desor, 1857 -- 7 species
 genus Sismondia Desor, 1857 † -- 5 species

References

Clypeasteroida
Echinoderm families